Bruce Edward Schroeder (born  1946) is an American lawyer and Wisconsin circuit court judge for Kenosha County. He is the longest-serving state court judge in Wisconsin, having been first appointed in 1983. He was previously district attorney of Kenosha County. He came to national attention in 2021 due to his role as the presiding judge for the trial of Kyle Rittenhouse.

Early life and political career
Schroeder was born in Milwaukee, Wisconsin, and graduated from Marquette University with a bachelor's degree in history and political science in 1967. He went on to Marquette University Law School and earned his J.D. in 1970. While in college, he was a member of the police force in Whitefish Bay.

Shortly after being admitted to the bar, Schroeder was hired as an assistant district attorney in Kenosha County, Wisconsin, under D.A. Burton A. Scott, and moved to Kenosha to accept the job.  As assistant district attorney, Schroeder was Kenosha's first juvenile prosecutor.

Less than two years later, the D.A., Burton Scott, was appointed to a vacant county judge position.  The Kenosha County Democratic Party endorsed Schroeder as his replacement. On August 17, 1972, Governor Patrick Lucey appointed Schroeder district attorney to fill the remainder of Scott's term.  In the Fall general election that year, Schroeder won election to a full term as D.A., defeating Republican Robert V. Baker in a close race.  He was subsequently re-elected in 1974 without opposition.

In the 1974 general election, Kenosha County's state senator, Doug La Follette, was elected Secretary of State of Wisconsin, creating a vacancy.  Schroeder entered the Democratic primary race for the April special election, but was defeated by John J. Maurer of Pleasant Prairie in a four-person race. Schroeder did not run for another term as district attorney in 1976.  He went into private practice after leaving office.

Schroeder was active in politics with the Democratic Party of Wisconsin through the 1970s, serving as the Kenosha County coordinator for the 1974 re-election campaign of U.S. senator Gaylord Nelson, and for the 1978 gubernatorial campaign of Martin J. Schreiber.  Due to the 1977 judicial reform laws, a number of new judicial posts were created in Kenosha County in 1978, and at that time Schroeder was named as a likely candidate for one of the new positions.  He was not appointed at that time, but served as a court commissioner for the new organization of the Wisconsin circuit courts from 1978 until his elevation in 1983.

Judicial career
In 1983, incumbent Wisconsin circuit court judge John E. Malloy died in office, creating a vacancy.  Schroeder was appointed to fill the position by Governor Tony Earl in May 1983, and was subsequently elected to a full six-year term in 1984 without opposition.  Since then, Schroeder has been re-elected seven times without facing an opponent, most recently in 2020. He is Wisconsin's longest-serving state court judge.

Schroeder has been the subject of controversy during his judicial career.  In 1987, he received attention for his order requiring HIV/AIDS testing for convicted prostitutes.  He developed a reputation for being "no-nonsense" and tough on defendants in court and in sentencing. Some attorneys have described him as an "old school" judge. As a result, hundreds of defendants assigned to his court have requested to be transferred to another judge.

Schroeder came to national attention in 2021 for presiding over the trial of Kyle Rittenhouse, who fatally shot two men during the unrest in Kenosha in August 2020. During the trial, some on the political left accused Schroeder of bias towards the Rittenhouse defense. He made several rulings in favor of the defense, including not allowing prosecutors to refer to the individuals Rittenhouse shot as "victims" and allowing the defense to refer to them as "arsonist" and "looters," as long as they could prove they did such activities. Prosecutor Thomas Binger reckoned that Schroeder had already admonished him thousands of times for calling someone a "victim" in other trials. Schroeder was also accused of being harsh towards prosecutor Binger by raising his voice and admonishing him for a line of questioning that undermined Rittenhouse's right to remain silent. Many legal experts noted the admonishment was appropriate.

Personal life
Schroeder married court clerk Donna Jean Lane on September 30, 1972, at the St. James Catholic Church in Kenosha. They have two adopted children, Terrence Michael (born September 11, 1979) and Mary Lynn (born April 20, 1982). Schroeder is a member of the German American Society.

Electoral history

Kenosha County District Attorney (1972, 1974)

| colspan="6" style="text-align:center;background-color: #e9e9e9;"| General Election, November 5, 1972

Wisconsin Senate (1975)

| colspan="6" style="text-align:center;background-color: #e9e9e9;"| Democratic Primary, February 18, 1975

Wisconsin Circuit Court (1984–present)

References

External links
 
  Judges and Commissioners at Kenosha County, Wisconsin
 Bruce Schoeder at Wisconsin Law Journal
 Hon. Bruce E. Schroeder - Kenosha, WI at FindLaw

Living people
1946 births
20th-century American judges
21st-century American judges
American legal scholars
Marquette University Law School alumni
Wisconsin state court judges
District attorneys in Wisconsin
Wisconsin Democrats
People from Milwaukee
American people of German descent